is a Japanese professional baseball pitcher for the Saitama Seibu Lions in Japan's Nippon Professional Baseball.

External links

NPB.com

1988 births
Living people
Baseball people from Fukuoka Prefecture
Waseda University alumni
Japanese baseball players
Nippon Professional Baseball pitchers
Saitama Seibu Lions players
Japanese baseball coaches
Nippon Professional Baseball coaches